American Premier Bank was a California state bank established by Chinese Americans in the United States. Headquartered in Arcadia, California, the bank was established on July 7, 2003, and was privately held.

On January 31, 2011, American Premier Bank, Arcadia merged with First General Bank, Rowland Heights. The name of the two merged banks will remain as First General Bank.

The bank catered to the local Chinese and Asian community which is more than 45% of the total population of the city.

References

External links
 American Premier Bank homepage

Companies based in Los Angeles County, California
Banks based in California
Banks established in 2003
Banks disestablished in 2011
Privately held companies based in California
Chinese American banks
Chinese-American culture in California
2011 mergers and acquisitions